Eupoecilia kruegeriana is a species of moth of the family Tortricidae. It is found in South Africa, Kenya, Tanzania and Uganda. The habitat consists of various shrub and forest areas, Acacia woodland and the edges of rain forests.

The wingspan is 11–12 mm for males and 14–15 mm for females. The forewings are pale ochreous with a golden sheen. The hindwings are pale ochreous, with slight fuscous suffusion along the termen.

References

Moths described in 1993
Eupoecilia